The Collaborative Research Center is a building on the Rockefeller University campus in New York City. Construction began in 2007, funded by a $50 million from the Starr Foundation.

References

External links
 The Rockefeller University, Collaborative Research Center at Turner Construction
 Collaborative Research Center at the Rockefeller University at cultureNOW

Buildings and structures in Manhattan
Rockefeller University